Idoma may refer to:

 Idoma people, Nigeria
 Idoma language

Language and nationality disambiguation pages